Robert II de Vaux of Pentney also known as Robert de Vallibus, Lord of Pentney, was a prominent 12th-century noble. He succeeded to the lands in Norfolk, Suffolk and Essex in England, held by his father Robert which had been received from Roger Bigod after the Norman conquest of England. Robert was the founder of the Augustinian Pentney Priory, dedicated to the Holy Trinity, St Mary and St Magdalene, which he established c.1130, for the souls of Agnes his wife and their children. He was succeeded by his eldest son William.

Marriage and issue
He married Agnes, daughter of Ranulf Fitz Walter and Matilda de Lanquetot, they are known to have had the following issue:
William de Vaux
Oliver de Vaux
Henry de Vaux

Notes

Citations

References
 
 
 

12th-century English people
Robert